Justin Chikwanda (born 27 November 1967) is a Zambian boxer. He competed in the men's bantamweight event at the 1988 Summer Olympics.

References

1967 births
Living people
Zambian male boxers
Olympic boxers of Zambia
Boxers at the 1988 Summer Olympics
Commonwealth Games medallists in boxing
Commonwealth Games bronze medallists for Zambia
Boxers at the 1990 Commonwealth Games
Place of birth missing (living people)
Bantamweight boxers
Medallists at the 1990 Commonwealth Games